Below are the results of the 2019 World Series of Poker Europe, held from October 13-November 4 at King's Casino in Rozvadov, Czech Republic. There are 15 scheduled bracelet events.

Key

Results

Event #1: €350 Opener No Limit Hold'em

 3-Day Event: October 13-15 
 Number of Entries: 1,011
 Total Prize Pool: €302,541
 Number of Payouts: 152
 Winning Hand:

Event #2: €550 Pot Limit Omaha

 3-Day Event: October 14-16
 Number of Entries: 476
 Total Prize Pool: €226,100
 Number of Payouts: 71
 Winning Hand:

Event #3: €1,350 Mini Main Event No Limit Hold'em

 3-Day Event: October 16-18
 Number of Entries: 766
 Total Prize Pool: €873,240
 Number of Payouts: 115
 Winning Hand:

Event #4: €250,000 Super High Roller No Limit Hold'em

 3-Day Event: October 16-18
 Number of Entries: 30 
 Total Prize Pool: €7,125,000
 Number of Payouts: 5
 Winning Hand:

Event #5: €2,500 8-Game Mix

 2-Day Event: October 17-18
 Number of Entries: 71
 Total Prize Pool: €237,500
 Number of Payouts: 11
 Winning Hand: Q-J-10-5-4 (2-7 Triple Draw)

Event #6: €25,500 Short Deck High Roller No Limit Hold'em

 2-Day Event: October 18-19
 Number of Entries: 111
 Total Prize Pool: €2,636,250
 Number of Payouts: 17
 Winning Hand:

Event #7: €1,100 Turbo Bounty Hunter No Limit Hold'em

 1-Day Event: October 19
 Number of Entries: 377
 Total Prize Pool: €348,631
 Number of Payouts: 57
 Winning Hand:

Event #8: €25,500 Platinum High Roller No Limit Hold'em

 3-Day Event: October 20-22
 Number of Entries: 83
 Total Prize Pool: €1,971,250
 Number of Payouts: 13
 Winning Hand:

Event #9: €1,650 Pot Limit Omaha/No Limit Hold'em Mix

 2-Day Event: October 20-21
 Number of Entries: 279
 Total Prize Pool: €397,575
 Number of Payouts: 42
 Winning Hand:

Event #10: €25,500 Mixed Games Championship

 3-Day Event: October 21-23
 Number of Entries: 45
 Total Prize Pool: €1,068,750
 Number of Payouts: 7
 Winning Hand:  (Pot Limit Omaha)

Event #11: €2,200 Pot Limit Omaha

 3-Day Event: October 22-24
 Number of Entries: 271
 Total Prize Pool: €520,049
 Number of Payouts: 41
 Winning Hand:

Event #12: €100,000 Diamond High Roller No Limit Hold'em

 3-Day Event: October 23-25
 Number of Entries: 72
 Total Prize Pool: €6,840,000
 Number of Payouts: 11
 Winning Hand:

Event #13: €2,500 Short Deck No Limit Hold'em

 2-Day Event: October 24-25
 Number of Entries: 179 
 Total Prize Pool: €391,115
 Number of Payouts: 27
 Winning Hand:

Event #14: €10,350 No Limit Hold'em Main Event

 7-Day Event: October 25-31
 Number of Entries: 541
 Total Prize Pool: €5,139,500
 Number of Payouts: 82
 Winning Hand:

Event #15: €550 Colossus No Limit Hold'em

 8-Day Event: October 28-November 4
 Number of Entries: 2,738
 Total Prize Pool: €1,300,550
 Number of Payouts: 396
 Winning Hand:

References

External links
PokerNews.com Live Updates

World Series of Poker Europe
2019 in poker